Donnchad mac Aedacain (or Donnchad Ua Conchobair) (died 877) was a King of Uisnech and Mide of the Clann Cholmáin. He was the grandson of the High King Conchobar mac Donnchada (died 833). He ruled as King of Mide from 864 to 877.

He came to the throne after the blinding of Lorcán mac Cathail by the high king Áed Findliath (died 879). Donnchad was deceitfully killed by his rival among the Clann Cholmáin, Flann Sinna in 877 who then became king.

Notes

References

External links
CELT: Corpus of Electronic Texts at University College Cork

Kings of Uisnech
9th-century Irish monarchs
867 deaths
Year of birth unknown